Infant Eyes is an album by organist Charlie Earland which was recorded in 1978 and released on the Muse label the following year.

Track listing
All compositions by Charles Earland except where noted
 "We Are Not Alone" – 5:03
 "Blues for Rudy" – 12:00
 "The Thang" – 7:10
 "Infant Eyes" (Wayne Shorter) – 6:14
 "Is It Necessary?" – 4:58

Personnel
Charles Earland – organ
Bill Hardman – trumpet
Frank Wess – tenor saxophone, flute
Mack Goldsbury – tenor saxophone (track 2)
Jimmy Ponder (tracks 1 & 2), Melvin Sparks (tracks 3–5) – guitar
Grady Tate – drums 
Lawrence Killian – percussion

References

Muse Records albums
Charles Earland albums
1979 albums
Albums produced by Ozzie Cadena
Albums recorded at Van Gelder Studio